Sandeep Khare is a Marathi poet, performing artist, actor, singer-songwriter, copywriter from Pune. So far he has published 3 of his books which are poetry collections, namely, 'Kadhi He..Kadhi Te..', 'Maunachi Bhashantare' (The translations of the Silences).

His songs have been sung by many notable Indian singers such as Salil Kulkarni, Shreya Ghoshal, Sunidhi Chauhan, Bela Shende, Shailesh Ranade etc.
 
He has diploma in electrical engineering from Govt. Polytechnic, Pune. He is married to Sonia and the couple has a daughter named Roomani Khare.

Poetry collections 

 Kadhi He Kadhi Te
 Maunachi Bhashantare
 Nenivechi Akshare
 Ayushyavar Bolu Kahi
 Tuzyavarachya Kavita

Discography

Diwas Ase Ki

Diwas Ase Ki was released in 1998.

 Lyrics & Music : Sandeep Khare
 Singers : Shailesh Ranade & Sandeep Khare

Songs from Diwas Ase Ki:
 Track 01/09 : Man Talyat Malyat – Shailesh Ranade
 Track 02/09 : Swar Tipecha – Shailesh Ranade
 Track 03/09 : Diwas Ase Ki – Shailesh Ranade
 Track 04/09 : Sarivar Sar – Sandeep Khare
 Track 05/09 : Majha Bolna..Majha Chalna – Shailesh Ranade
 Track 06/09 : Kase Sartil Saye – Sandeep Khare
 Track 07/09 : Kshitijacha Par – Shailesh Ranade
 Track 08/09 : Sairabhira Zala Sara Vara – Shailesh Ranade
 Track 09/09 : Evdach Na – Sandeep Khare

Me Gato Ek Gane

Me Gato Ek Gane was released in 2000.

Songs from Me Gato Ek Gane:
 Wishwarambha Pasun Yethe – Sandeep Khare
 Me Gato Ek Gane – Sandeep Khare
 Ratra Sundar...Chandra Sundar – Sandeep Khare
 Yein Swapnat – Sandeep Khare
 Ghet Nirop Nabhacha – Shailesh Ranade
 Halu Halu Tiney Mala – Shailesh Ranade
 Chala Rey Majha – Shailesh Ranade
 Mana Hoi Megh Weda – Sandeep Khare

With Salil Kulkarni

Ayushyawar Bolu Kahi
This debut album with Salil Kulkarni was released in 2003.
Music and lyrics were by Sandeep Khare.

Songs from Ayushyawar Bolu Kahi:
 Track 01/08 : Ayushyawar Bolu Kahi – Sandeep Khare & Salil Kulkarni
 Track 02/08 : He Bhalte Avaghad Aste – Sandeep Khare & Salil Kulkarni
 Track 03/08 : Pratyekachi Ratra Thodi Aatun Aatun Vedi – Sandeep Khare & Salil Kulkarni
 Track 04/08 : Nasates Ghari Tu Jevha – Salil Kulkarni
 Track 05/08 : Mi Morcha Nela Nahi Mi Samphi Kela Nahi – Sandeep Khare
 Track 06/08 : Aatasha Ase He Mala Kaay Hote – Salil Kulkarni
 Track 07/08 : Saheb Mhanto Chepen Chepen – Sandeep Khare & Salil Kulkarni
 Track 08/08 : Ved Lagla Mala Ved Lagla – Sandeep Khare

Namanjoor
 Music: Sandeep Khare
 Lyrics: Sandeep Khare
 Singers: Salil Kulkarni & Sandeep Khare

Songs from Namanjoor:
 Track 01/08 : Tujhya Majhya Save – Salil Kulkarni
 Track 02/08 : Me Hajar Chintanni – Sandeep Khare
 Track 03/08 : Ajun Tari Rool Sodun – Sandeep Khare & Salil Kulkarni
 Track 04/08 : Megh Nasta Veej Nasta – Sandeep Khare
 Track 05/08 : Kitik Halave – Salil Kulkarni
 Track 06/08 : Deva Mala – Sandeep Khare
 Track 07/08 : Atasha Me – Salil Kulkarni
 Track 08/08 : Namanjoor – Sandeep Khare & Salil Kulkarni

Sang Sakhya Re
 Music: Salil Kulkarni
 Music Arrangement: Kamlesh Bhadkamkar and Mithilesh Patankar
 Singers: Sandeep Khare and Salil Kulkarni

Songs from Sang Sakhya Re:
 Track 01/11 : Paus Asa Runazunata – Salil Kulkarni
 Track 02/11 : Priye Ye Nighoni – Sandeep Khare & Salil Kulkarni
 Track 03/11 : Hee Tarunai – Salil Kulkarni
 Track 04/11 : Tuzhe Ni Maaze Naate Kaay – Salil Kulkarni
 Track 05/11 : Tutale – Salil Kulkarni
 Track 06/11 : Saang Sakhya Re – Salil Kulkarni
 Track 07/11 : Alcohol – Sandeep Khare
 Track 08/11 : Nako Oadh Laavun Ghevu Oonhachi – Sandeep Khare & Salil Kulkarni
 Track 09/11 : Laagte Anaam Oadh – Salil Kulkarni
 Track 10/11 : Ajoon Ujadat Naahi Ga – Salil Kulkarni
 Track 11/11 : Vyartha He Saarech Taho – Sandeep Khare

Aggobai Dhaggobai
 Music: Sandeep Khare and Salil Kulkarni
 Singers: Sandeep Khare, Salil Kulkarni, Anjali Kulkarni

Songs from Aggobai Dhaggobai:
 Aggobai Dhaggobai – Sandeep Khare and Salil Kulkarni
 Mungibai  – Sandeep Jhare& Chorous
 Me Pappancha Dhapun phone – Sandeep Khare & Saleel Kulkarni
 Boom Boom Ba – Sandeep Khare and Salil Kulkarni
 Dur deshi gela baba – Salil Kulkarni
 Superman – Sandeep & Saleel
 Babachi Vyatha – Sandeep Khare and Salil Kulkarni

Dipadi Dipang
 Music:Saleel Kulkarni
 Singers: Sandeep Khare and Salil Kulkarni, Vaishali Made, Vibhavari Apate, Anjali kulkarni, Avadoot Gupte
 Dipadi Dipang – Anjali Kulkarni & Saleel Kulkarni
 He Gandhit Vaare – Saleel Kulkarni
 Khsanaat Lapoon – Saleel Kulkarni
 Yala Kar Phone – Sandeep Khare
 Sakhe Kase Saang Tula – Saleel Kulkarni
 Premat Mhane – Sandeep & Vibhavari apte
 Bara Navha – Sandeep & Vaishali made
 Yala Kar Phone (Karaoke)

Damalelya Babanchi Kahani
Damalelya Babanchi Kahani was released in 2010.
They sang this song for the first time on their 500th performance on Zee Marathi.

Songs from Damalelya Babanchi Kahani:
 Damalelya Babanchi Kahani – Sandeep Khare, Saleel Kulkarni
 Bandh Manache – Sandeep Khare, Saleel Kulkarni
 Challay Kaay – Sandeep, Saleel Kulkarni
 Ikkad Raja, Tikkad Raja – Sandeep Khare, Saleel, Kamalakar
 Jaab Tula Re Kuni Pusava – Sandeep Khare, Saleel Kulkarni
 Kon Dete Kon Dete – Sandeep, Saleel Kulkarni
 Mi Phaslo Mhanuni – Sandeep, Saleel Kulkarni
 Vanvaa – Sunidhi Chauhan

Hrudaya Madhale Gaane
Hrudaya Madhale Gaane was released in 2009.
singer:[Bela Shende]
Music: Salil Kulkarni

Songs from Hrudaya Madhale Gaane
Hrudaya Madhale Gaane
Jantar Mantar
Majhya Mana re
Nilya
Durnabhachya Palyad
Rati Ardhya Rati
Tujhya Vina Sakhya

With Madhuri Purandare

Kadhi He Kadhi Te
Kadhi He Kadhi Te released in 2003 was a set of twin albums.

Songs from Kadhi He:
 Kadhi Hey...Kadhi Tey – Sandeep Khare
 Ti Ruslelya – Sandeep Khare
 Rey Fulanchi – Sandeep Khare
 Sahaj Kadhi – Madhuri Purandare
 Konitari Bolavtai – Sandeep Khare
 Kalu dey Dolyanchi Bhasha – Madhuri Purandare
 He Nashib – Sandeep Khare
 Harlyasarkhe Chalaiche – Sandeep Khare

Songs from Kadhi Te:
 Wede Haiku – Sandeep Khare
 Don Haat Don Pai (Khaparpanjobancha gane) – Sandeep Khare
 Maunibaba – Sandeep Khare
 Rengalat Rengalat – Sandeep Khare
 Ha Pyala Shevatcha – Sandeep Khare
 Lagbag Lagbag – Sandeep Khare
 Dishach Disha Hya – Madhuri Purandare
 Lahi Lahi Unh Unh – Sandeep Khare

Stage shows

Ayushawar Bolu Kahi

This stage show has more than 1000 performances around the world. Sandeep and Saleel have had several performances in the US, UK, Dubai, and Australia. They performed on the last day of "Vishwa Marathi Sahitya Sammelan" at San Jose, USA.

Kadhitari Vedyagat

It's a stage presentation of the poems done in theatrical style without any prose but only with poetry.
Performers: Sandeep, Madhura Velankar, and Amruta Subhash/Vibhavari Deshpande.

Film career
In 2008, Sandeep worked as the lyricist for a Bollywood animation movie Dasavathaaram.

Marathi Movies : 
 Nishani Dava Angatha
 Hapus 
 Haay Kaay Naay Kaay
 Anandi Anand
 Zamin (Upcoming movie)
 Bioscope - Mitra (Marathi Movie) 2015

In 2019, he also acted in a Marathi film Thackeray based on the life of Balasaheb Thackeray, in which he played the character of Manohar Joshi.

References

External links 
 
Saneep Khare at Saavn
Sandeep Khare books on Book Ganga

1973 births
Living people
Indian male singer-songwriters
Indian singer-songwriters
Marathi-language writers
Marathi-language singers
Marathi-language poets
Singers from Pune